Firanda Djunaidi (born 5 October 2003), simply known as Firanda, is an Indonesian footballer who plays a forward for Asprov Babel and the Indonesia women's national team.

Club career
Firanda has played for Asprov Babel in Indonesia.

International career 
Firanda represented Indonesia at the 2022 AFC Women's Asian Cup qualification.

References

External links

2003 births
Living people
Sportspeople from the Bangka Belitung Islands
Indonesian women's footballers
Women's association football forwards
Indonesia women's youth international footballers
Indonesia women's international footballers